The Annunciation Greek Orthodox Church of Newburyport is a Greek Orthodox Church in Newburyport, Massachusetts. It was founded in 1917 by 60 Greek-Americans but did not have a building to worship in until 1924. In August 1983, a fire burned down the church; it was later rebuilt in 1985. The church is still active to this day.

List of Pastors since 1924
 Rev. P. Christakos
 Rev. Basil Koskoris
 Rev. E. Righellis
 Rev. George Thalasinos
 Rev. J. Mesarchakis
 Rev. K. Kakoyiannis
 Rev. Panagiotis Frentzos
 Rev. Timothy Houndras
 Rev. Athanasios Aloupis
 Rev. S. Zannis
 Rev. N. Markopoulos
 Rev. Christos Moulas
 Rev. D. Papalambrou
 Rev. Spyridon Papademetriou
 Rev. Achilles Siagris
 Rev. Harry P. Hatzopoulos
 Rev. Filotheos Faros
 Rev. George E. Economou
 Rev. Stanely S. Harakas
 Rev. Aris Metrakos
 Rev. Christopher Foustoukos
 Rev. Andrew Mahalares
 Rev. Kyriakos Saravelas
 Rev. Constantine Newman
 Rev. Costin Popescu (current)

External links
 Official Website

Greek-American culture in Massachusetts
Greek Orthodox churches in the United States
Eastern Orthodox churches in Massachusetts
Churches in Essex County, Massachusetts
Buildings and structures in Newburyport, Massachusetts
Churches completed in 1917
1917 establishments in Massachusetts